Longwell Green is a suburb just outside the east fringe of Bristol. Longwell Green takes its name from the medieval well which used to be situated on the site of the Church.  It is located within the traditional county of Gloucestershire and the unitary authority of South Gloucestershire (previously Avon).  It lies along the A431 Bath Road, near the River Avon at grid reference . Population (2011 census) was 6761.

Next to the A4174 are retail and leisure parks.
There is a primary school, and Community Centre.

References

Villages in South Gloucestershire District
Areas of Bristol